Traces of a Black Haired Girl is a 1972 Yugoslav film directed by Zdravko Randić. It was entered into the 22nd Berlin International Film Festival.

Cast
 Pavle Vujisic - Paja
 Boris Dvornik
 Neda Spasojevic - Slavica
 Ruzica Sokic
 Velimir 'Bata' Zivojinovic - Sinter

References

External links

1972 films
1972 drama films
Serbian drama films
Serbo-Croatian-language films
Yugoslav drama films